Southerham Works Pit is a  geological Site of Special Scientific Interest  in Lewes in East Sussex. It is a Geological Conservation Review site.

This site exposes layers of the Chalk Group dating to the Upper Cretaceous between 90 and 87 million years ago. It is a key site for understanding the lithostratigraphy of the period and the environments of its chalk sea as well as the evolution and taxonomy of Upper Cretaceous fish.

There is access to the southern end of the site from Southerham Lane.

References

Sites of Special Scientific Interest in East Sussex
Geological Conservation Review sites